Estádio da Gaza is a multi-purpose stadium in Gaza, Mozambique.  It is currently used mostly for football matches and is the home stadium of Clube Desportivo Gaza.  The stadium holds 4,000 people.

Clube Desportivo Gaza
Multi-purpose stadiums in Mozambique
Buildings and structures in Gaza Province
Sport in Maputo